The Haṭhābhyāsapaddhati ("Manual on the practice of Haṭha yoga") is a manual of Haṭha yoga written in Sanskrit in the 18th century, attributed to Kapāla Kuraṇṭaka; it is the only known work before modern yoga to describe elaborate sequences of asanas and survives in a single manuscript. It includes unusual elements such as rope poses.

Manuscript

The Haṭhābhyāsapaddhati is an 18th-century manuscript, written by Kapāla Kurantaka, that describes elaborate sequences of asanas in Haṭha yoga, including many that are not practised today. Its name means "Manual on the practice of Haṭha yoga". It was written before the British Raj and well before the advent of modern yoga, but it appears to have been influenced by the physical culture of the period in India, including the practice of martial arts. It is arranged in six groups and includes asanas such as Gajāsana, elephant pose, which demand repeated movements, in the case of Gajāsana repetitions of Adho Mukha Svanasana, downward dog pose. It also contains postures that require great agility and strength, such as to cross the legs in Padmasana and then to climb a rope using only the hands. It states that the aim of the practice of asanas is to attain bodily strength (śārīradārḍhya) and to prepare the yogin for the practice of the purifications (satkarmas). 

The manuscript describes the dynamic asanas with instructions to the yogi, for instance:

The manuscript gives instructions for ten different rope poses. It is one of the few surviving texts which contain rope poses (the Sritattvanidhi is another); Birch notes that Krishnamacharya also used rope poses (in the 20th century), attributing them to a "lost" document, the Yoga Kurunta. Birch asks whether the name of that "document” was based on the name of the author of the Haṭhābhyāsapaddhati, Kapāla Kurantaka.

References

Sources 

 
 
 
 

Hatha yoga texts